After the Beep is an Australian television comedy series which screened on the ABC in 1996. The series is produced by John O'Grady, directed by Geoffrey Portmann and written by Julie Harris.

Cast
 Genevieve Lemon as Josephine Donnelly
 Genevieve Mooy as Mae Santos
 June Salter as Kath Dillon
 Kerry Walker as Mary Donnelly
 Emily Weare as Grace Fleming
 Giordano Gangl as Colin Green
 Richard Healy as Steve Baker
 Bruce Spence	
 Stan Kouros	
 Greg Bepper

External links

After the Beep at Australian Television

1996 Australian television series debuts
1996 Australian television series endings
Australian Broadcasting Corporation original programming
Australian comedy television series